Aryeh Moshe Eliyahu Kaplan (October 23, 1934 – January 28, 1983) was an American Orthodox rabbi, author, and translator, best known for his Living Torah edition of the Torah. He became well known as a prolific writer and was lauded as an original thinker. His wide-ranging literary output, inclusive of introductory pamphlets on Jewish beliefs and philosophy written at the request of NCSY, is often regarded as a significant factor in the growth of the baal teshuva movement.

Early life
Aryeh Kaplan was born in the Bronx, New York City to Samuel and Fannie (Lackman) Kaplan of the Sefardi Recanati family from Salonika, Greece. His mother, Fannie Kaplan, died on December 31, 1947, when he was 13, and his two younger sisters, Sandra and Barbara, were sent to a foster home. Kaplan was expelled from public school after acting out, leading him to grow up as a "street kid" in the Bronx.

Kaplan did not grow up religious and was known as "Len". His family had only a slight connection to Jewish practice, but he was encouraged to say Kaddish for his mother. On his first day at the minyan, Henoch Rosenberg, a 14-year Klausenburger Hosid, realized that Len was out of place, as he was not wearing tefillin or opening a siddur, and befriended him. Henoch Rosenberg and his siblings taught Kaplan Hebrew, and within a few days, Kaplan was learning Chumash.

When he was 15, Kaplan enrolled at Yeshiva Torah Vodaas, and at age 18 (from January 1953 until June 1953) was among "a small cadre of talmidim" selected to help Rabbi Simcha Wasserman open Yeshiva Ohr Elchonon, a new yeshiva in Los Angeles.

In January 1956 Kaplan then went to Israel, and studied at the Mir in Jerusalem in Israel, where he received semikhah (ordination) from some of Israel's foremost poseks, including Yoreh Yoreh from Yitzhak HaLevi Herzog and Yadin Yadin from Eliezer Yehuda Finkel in 1956.

Secular career 
Upon returning from Israel in August of 1956, Kaplan became a Hebrew teacher first in Richmond, Virginia and then in the Bronx, before moving to Louisville, Kentucky. In Louisville, he taught at Eliahu Academy  and beginning in the 1957 fall semester studied at University of Louisville, where he joined Sigma Pi Sigma, the Woodcock Society, and Phi Kappa Phi and eventually completed his bachelor's degree in physics on June 11, 1961. While in Louisville, he met Tobie Goldstein, whom he married on June 13, 1961, and with whom he had nine children.

Kaplan is mentioned in Igros Moshe: he asked of and received a response from Moshe Feinstein regarding the matter of permitting/enabling a youth minyan to which parents would drive children on Shabbos.

Kaplan then moved to Hyattsville, Maryland, in 1961 to study physics at the University of Maryland and begin his first professional position as a research scientist at the National Bureau of Standards's Fluid Mechanics Division, where he was in charge of magnetohydrodynamics research. Kaplan earned his M.S. degree in physics from University of Maryland in 1963. After graduating, Kaplan remained at University of Maryland as a National Science Foundation fellow through the fall semester of 1964.

Rabbinic career 
In 1965, Kaplan switched careers and began practicing as a rabbi. His career here divides between pulpit roles initially, and other roles thereafter when based in Brooklyn, New York.

Pulpit roles 
Adas Israel (1965–1966): On February 19, 1965, Kaplan moved to Mason City, Iowa, where he became the Rabbi of Adas Israel. According to a February 1965 article, "Because of his teaching and study since ordination, this is Rabbi Kaplan's first pulpit."
B'nai Sholom (1966–1967): On August 7, 1966, Kaplan became the Rabbi at B'nai Sholom, a Conservative synagogue in Blountville, Tennessee. He held the position through 1967.
Adath Israel (1967–1969): In 1967, Kaplan became the Rabbi at Adath Israel (now known as Adath Shalom), a Conservative synagogue in Dover, New Jersey. He kept this position through 1969.
Ohav Shalom (1969–1971): Kaplan then moved to Albany, New York, where he became the Rabbi at Ohav Shalom, a Conservative synagogue.  During this time, he also functioned as the president of the AJCC (Albany Jewish Community Center) and the Hillel Counselor to the B'nai B'rith Hillel Counselorship at University at Albany, SUNY.

Brooklyn 
In 1971 Kaplan moved to Brooklyn, New York, where he lived until the end of his life (1983) . Kaplan did not hold any positions there as a pulpit rabbi, but had many other roles which involved, chiefly, writing and editing religious publications:
 Chaplain at Hunter and Baruch colleges (New York), from 1971 to 1972
 Associate Editor of "Intercom", of the Association of Orthodox Jewish Scientists, from 1972 to 1973
 Editor of Union of Orthodox Jewish Congregations of America's Jewish Life magazine from 1973 to 1974
 Director of publishing at the NCSY from 1974 to 1975.

In the 1970s, Kaplan served in the unofficial capacity of the spiritual advisor for NCSY's Brooklyn region. He would converse with teenagers and answer their questions, whether in his home or at drawn-out NCSY conventions where "Aryeh Kaplan was the last adult standing."

He would also deliver lectures at his home in Kensington, which many locals would regularly attend.

He also served as the rabbinic consultant for the play "Yentl", after the director met him on the Staten Island Ferry.  When asked about his association with a play containing nudity and a woman dressed as a man, Kaplan was quoted to have said "It is an abomination, but so what?"

NCSY
Kaplan was involved with NCSY as an author, speaker, and spiritual mentor.

Pinchas Stolper's wrote in his introduction to The Aryeh Kaplan Anthology how he "discovered" Kaplan:

Literary output 
Kaplan produced works on topics as varied as prayer, Jewish marriage and meditation. His writing incorporated ideas from across the spectrum of Rabbinic literature, Kabbalah, and Hasidut, all without ignoring science. The concise and detail-orientated character of his works have been described as reflective of his physicist training. In researching his books, Kaplan once remarked "I use my physics background to analyze and systematize data, very much as a physicist would deal with physical reality."

From 1976 onward, Kaplan worked to translate Me'am Lo'ez (Torah Anthology), which was originally written in Ladino and in time edited for Hebrew (1967). Kaplan was described as working with his typewriter, "the Me’am Loez in Ladino on one side of him and the Hebrew version on the other side, and he’d look from one to the other and back again, comparing and contrasting and typing away furiously the entire time." Shortly before his death, he completed The Living Torah, an original translation of the Five Books of Moses and the Haftarot.

Kaplan was described by Rabbi Pinchas Stolper, his original sponsor, as never fearing to speak his mind. "He saw harmony between science and Judaism, where many others saw otherwise. He put forward creative and original ideas and hypotheses, all the time anchoring them in classical works of rabbinic literature."

Death 

Kaplan died at his home of a heart attack on January 28, 1983, at the age of 48. He was buried in Jerusalem's Mount of Olives Jewish Cemetery, off Aweiss street, in section 1 of "Agudas Achim Anshei America."

Legacy 
Posthumously, Rabbi Kaplan's Living Torah spurred others to pick up the mantle and produce a spiritual continuation for the rest of the Bible: The Living Nach (published in 3 volumes in the 1990s).

Decades after his passing, his works continue to attract a readership among novices and scholars alike, and his extensive references are appreciated as a valuable resource.

His works have been translated into Czech, French, Hungarian, Modern Hebrew, Portuguese, Russian, German and Spanish.

In 2021, NCSY republished Kaplan's works "so a new generation can be introduced to the majesty of Jewish ideas and the beauty of Rabbi Kaplan’s prose".

The Aryeh Kaplan Academy day school in Louisville, Kentucky, is named in honor of Rabbi Aryeh Kaplan.

Bibliography

Religious works 
The Living Torah, Rabbi Kaplan's best-known work, is a translation into English of the Torah, and one of the first to be structured around the parshiyot (the traditional division of the Torah text). It includes maps and diagrams, and incorporated research on realia, flora, fauna, and geography (here, drawing on sources as varied as Josephus, Dio Cassius, Philostratus and Herodotus). The work features frequent footnotes, which also indicate differences in interpretation amongst the commentators, classic and modern. Rabbi Kaplan called this book his 10th child, since it took him exactly nine months to complete. (Moznaim, 1981)
"The Handbook of Jewish Thought," produced early in his career, is a wide-ranging treatment of Judaism's fundamental beliefs in two volumes, the first of which was published in Kaplan's lifetime. A chapter titled "Creation," in which Rabbi Kaplan "presents evolution as part of the basic tenets of Judaism," was omitted from publication.
"Torah Anthology," a 45-volume translation of Me'am Lo'ez from Ladino (Judæo-Spanish) into English. Rabbi Kaplan was the primary translator.
"Made in Heaven: A Jewish Wedding Guide" (Moznaim)
"Tefillin: God, Man and Tefillin"; "Love Means Reaching Out"; "Maimonides' Principles"; "The Fundamentals of Jewish Faith"; "The Waters of Eden: The Mystery of the Mikvah"; "Jerusalem: Eye of the Universe" — a series of highly popular and influential booklets on aspects of Jewish philosophy and various religious practices. Published by the Orthodox Union/NCSY or as an anthology by Artscroll, 1991, .
Five booklets of the Young Israel Intercollegiate  — "Belief in God"; "Free Will and the Purpose of Creation"; "The Jew"; "Love and the Commandments"; and "The Structure of Jewish Law" launched his writing career. He was also a frequent contributor to The Jewish Observer. (These articles have been published as a collection: Artscroll, 1986)
.
Sichot HaRan ("Rabbi Nachman's Wisdom"), edited by Rabbi Zvi Aryeh Rosenfeld who had requested Kaplan translate this. Kaplan also translated and annotated Until the Mashiach: The Life of Rabbi Nachman, a day-to-day account of Rebbe Nachman's life, for the Breslov Research Institute. In conjunction with Rosenfeld, Kaplan translated and annotated Rabbi Nachman's Tikkun (based on the Tikkun HaKlali).
Kaplan translated and annotated classic works on Jewish mysticism — Sefer Yetzirah, Bahir, and Derekh Hashem — as well as produced much original work on the subject in English. His Moreh Ohr, a Hebrew-language work, discusses the purpose of Creation, tzimtzum and free will from a kabbalistic point of view.
"If You Were God," his final work, was published posthumously in 1983. It encourages the reader to ponder topics concerning the nature of being and Divine providence.

Release dates

Academic papers 
While a graduate student at the University of Maryland, Rabbi Kaplan published two academic papers:

See also 
 Modern day Orthodox Jewish views on evolution
 Neo-Hasidism

References

External links 
Online Living Torah by Rabbi Aryeh Kaplan at ort.org 
Online Sabbath - Day of Eternity by Rabbi Aryeh Kaplan at ou.org
Collected Writings on aish.com
Lecture on Jewish Mysticism by Rabbi Aryeh Kaplan
"Kabbalah and the Age of the Universe" speech given by Rabbi Kaplan in 1979 (posthumously published online as The Age of the Universe: A Torah True Perspective)
Gravesite of Rabbi Aryeh Kaplan
Rabbi Dov Meir Eisenstein's sefer 'Morah Or' has a two-page biography

1934 births
1983 deaths
20th-century American rabbis
American people of Greek-Jewish descent
American Sephardic Jews
Sephardi rabbis
American Haredi rabbis
American Jewish theologians
Authors of Kabbalistic works
Breslov Hasidism
20th-century American physicists
Jewish physicists
Jewish American writers
Writers from the Bronx
Writers from Brooklyn
20th-century American writers
20th-century translators
Jewish translators of the Bible
Translators of the Bible into English
Hebrew–English translators
Translators from Hebrew
Translators from Aramaic
Burials at the Jewish cemetery on the Mount of Olives
Scientists from New York (state)
Critics of Christianity
Mir Yeshiva alumni